Habib Saad is a Ghanaian politician and member of the Seventh Parliament of the Fourth Republic of Ghana representing the Bortianor-Ngleshie-Amanfro Constituency in the Greater Accra Region on the ticket of the New Patriotic Party.

References

Ghanaian MPs 2017–2021
1968 births
Living people
Ghanaian Muslims
New Patriotic Party politicians